Tamás Kovács (born 20 March 1943) is a Hungarian fencer. He won bronze medals in the team sabre events at the 1968 and 1972 Summer Olympics.

References

External links
 

1943 births
Living people
Hungarian male sabre fencers
Olympic fencers of Hungary
Fencers at the 1968 Summer Olympics
Fencers at the 1972 Summer Olympics
Fencers at the 1976 Summer Olympics
Olympic bronze medalists for Hungary
Olympic medalists in fencing
Fencers from Budapest
Medalists at the 1968 Summer Olympics
Medalists at the 1972 Summer Olympics